Silvia Kutika (born August 5, 1956 in Wilde) is an Argentine actress of Hungarian descent; the original family name was Kutiko.

She is best known by her roles in soap operas such as: 906090 Modelos, Vidas Robadas, Los Médicos de Hoy, De Carne Somos, and Manuela. In 1996 she married actor Luis Luque.

Television

Filmography

References

External links 
 

People from Avellaneda Partido
Argentine television actresses
Argentine film actresses
Argentine people of Hungarian descent
1958 births
Living people